Mohammad Durailu (also Romanized as Moḩammad Dūrāīlū; also known as Moḩammad Dūlū) is a village in Sivkanlu Rural District, in the Central District of Shirvan County, North Khorasan Province, Iran. At the 2006 census, its population was 32, in 9 families.

References 

Populated places in Shirvan County